Sterling Financial Corporation was a bank holding company headquartered in Spokane, Washington. In 2014, the company was acquired by Umpqua Holdings Corporation.

The bank operated 173 branches in Washington, Oregon, California, Idaho.

History
The company commenced operations in 1983. 

In 1998, the company acquired 33 branches from KeyCorp.

In 2007, the company agreed to acquire North Valley Bancorp for $196 million in cash and stock, but the merger was cancelled after failing to win regulatory approval.

During the financial crisis of 2007-2008, the company received a $303 million investment by the United States Department of the Treasury as part of the Troubled Asset Relief Program.

In October 2009, the company received a cease and desist order from regulators and initiated executive changes. In 2010, the company raised $730 million in capital to avoid being shut down by regulators. Thomas H. Lee Partners and Warburg Pincus each acquired a 22.6% stake in the company.

In 2011, the company acquired Vancouver-based First Independent Bank.

In 2012, the company changed the name of its bank from Sterling Savings Bank to Sterling Bank and laid off 6% of its workforce.

In March 2013, the company acquired American Heritage Holdings for $6.5 million.

In May 2013, the company acquired the Seattle-area operations of Boston Private Bank & Trust Company.

In October 2013, the company acquired Commerce National Bank for $42.9 million.

In February 2014, the company sold 6 branches to Banner Bank.

On April 18, 2014, Umpqua Holdings Corporation acquired the company for $2 billion in cash and stock.

External links

References

1983 establishments in Washington (state)
American companies established in 1983
Banks established in 1983
Banks disestablished in 2014
Companies formerly listed on the Nasdaq
Defunct banks of the United States